The London, Midland and Scottish Railway (LMS) Stanier Class 2 0-4-4T was a class of 10 light passenger locomotives built in 1932.  Ostensibly designed under new Chief Mechanical Engineer (CME) William Stanier, they were in fact the last new design of the Midland Railway's school of engineering.

Overview 
The Midland Railway had a large number of 1P 0-4-4T and this was a larger version of the larger wheeled design, classified 2P.  The ten built were numbered 6400–6409 by the LMS and renumbered 1900–1909 shortly before nationalisation, freeing the numbers for new LMS Ivatt Class 2 2-6-0s.  British Railways adding 40000 to their numbers making them 41900–41909.  Although the last new Midland-style design, as subsequent Stanier engines incorporated much Great Western Railway practice, they were not the last MR-designed locomotives built with some 4Fs appearing as late as 1940.

The class was originally built with stovepipe chimneys, apparently due to an oversight by Stanier due to the design for future LMS locomotive chimneys not being finalised. All were later fitted with Stanier chimneys.

Two of the locomotives were fitted with vacuum control gear in 1934 for working the motor trains on the St Alban's branch, and allocated to Watford Junction shed. The remainder were fitted in the BR period and used at a number of different sheds including Warwick and Longsight.
(Motor trains was the terminology used by the LMS although they later became popularly referred to as push-pull trains. The suitably modified stock was marked as pull-push).

Details

Withdrawal 
All were withdrawn in November 1959 except 41900, which was withdrawn in March 1962. None were preserved.

References 
 
 
 

Notes

External links

 Class 2P-C Details at Rail UK

2 Stanier 0-4-4T
0-4-4T locomotives
Railway locomotives introduced in 1932
Scrapped locomotives
Standard gauge steam locomotives of Great Britain
Passenger locomotives